1962 in the Philippines details events of note that happened in the Philippines in the year 1962.

Incumbents

 President: Diosdado Macapagal (Liberal) 
 Vice President: Emmanuel Pelaez (Liberal) 
 Chief Justice: César Bengzon 
 Congress: 5th (starting January 22)

Events

February
 February 16 – Caloocan becomes a city in the province of Rizal through Republic Act No. 3278.

May
 May 12 – Diosdado Macapagal changed the date of the commemoration of Philippine Independence from July 4 to June 12.

Holidays

As per Act No. 2711 section 29, issued on March 10, 1917, any legal holiday of fixed date falls on Sunday, the next succeeding day shall be observed as legal holiday. Sundays are also considered legal religious holidays. Bonifacio Day was added through Philippine Legislature Act No. 2946. It was signed by then-Governor General Francis Burton Harrison in 1921. On October 28, 1931, the Act No. 3827 was approved declaring the last Sunday of August as National Heroes Day. As per Republic Act No. 3022, April 9th is proclaimed as Bataan Day. 

 January 1 – New Year's Day
 February 22 – Legal Holiday
 April 9 – Araw ng Kagitingan (Day of Valor)
 April 19 – Maundy Thursday
 April 20 – Good Friday
 May 1 – Labor Day
 July 4 – Philippine Republic Day
 August 13  – Legal Holiday
 August 26  – National Heroes Day
 November 22 – Thanksgiving Day
 November 30 – Bonifacio Day
 December 25 – Christmas Day
 December 30 – Rizal Day

Births
 January 8 – John Castriciones, lawyer, public servant, writer
 January 21 – Ronald dela Rosa, politician and Chief of the Philippine National Police
 February 9 – Dennis Padilla, actor and comedian.
 March 7 – Irma Adlawan, actress
 March 8 – Jose Jaime Espina, journalist (d. 2021)
 March 26 – Francisco Emmanuel Ortega III, politician
 March 27 – Roberto Puno, politician
 March 29 – Ted Failon, broadcast journalist
 April 1 – Samboy Lim, basketball player
 April 4 – Roderick Paulate, actor, comedian, and politician
 May 8 – Edwin Lacierda, lawyer and technology entrepreneur
 May 12 – Daniel Fernando, actor and politician
 June 29 – Paulyn Ubial, physician and former Secretary of Health
 July 2 – Carmelita Abalos, politician
 August 1 – Cesar Montano, actor and director
 August 11 – Mel Senen Sarmiento, politician
 October 15 – Rolando Joselito Bautista, Secretary of Agrarian Reform
 October 16 – Joseph Cua, politician
 December 12 – Carlito Galvez Jr., army general

References